Northeastern Tasmanian, or Pyemmairre, is an aboriginal language of Tasmania.

It is identified in the reconstruction of Claire Bowern. It was spoken in the northeastern corner of the island.

Northeastern Tasmanian is attested from three word lists of Charles Robinson and George Augustus Robinson: From Cape Portland (366 words), Ben Lomond (195 words), and Pipers River (126 words). Bowern also includes the language of the Port Dalrymple vocabulary (125 words) collected by J.-P. Gaimard in the Tamar River region of the North Midlands; however, it is divergent, and Dixon & Crowley consider it to be a distinct language.

The name Pyemmairre may not include the highland people of Ben Lomond, for which Plangermaireener ("Plangamerina") has been used.

References

North East Tasmania
Northeastern Tasmanian languages